Marainthirunthu Paarkum Marmam Enna is a 2018 Indian Tamil-language thriller drama film written and directed by R. Raheshe. The film stars Dhruvva, Aishwarya Dutta, Anjana Prem, Saranya Ponvannan in the main lead roles while J. D. Chakravarthy, Radha Ravi, Manobala play supportive roles in the film.  P. G. Muthiah serves as the cinematographer for the film. The music for the film is composed by Achu Rajamani. The film underwent censorship issues before its theatrical release on 17 August 2018. The film received average reviews from the audience upon the release.

Plot 
Japan (Dhruvva) is a cylinder delivery boy who intrudes into the chain smuggling gang to get to know the people behind the death of his dear ones.

Cast 

 Dhruvva as Japan (Aiyappan)
 Aishwarya Dutta as Bharathi, a North Chennai based girl
 Anjana Prem as Japan's wife
 Saranya Ponvannan as Japan's mother
 Radha Ravi
 J. D. Chakravarthy as Dilip Chakravarthy
 Manobala
 Aruldoss
 Mime Gopi as Mattai
 Ramachandran Durairaj as Jeeva
 Nagineedu
 Raviraj

Production 
The film commenced its production venture in late 2015 with R. Rakesh making his second directorial venture through this project after Thagadu Thagadu. The movie also initially marked the debut production venture of popular Tamil film cinematographer P. G. Muthiah. However the cinematographer-turned-producer was replaced by V. Mathiyalagan due to financial problems. The film was adapted as a female-centric one and was based on female oriented story related to chain stealing which is considered as a usual aspect in Tamil Nadu.

The title of the film Maraindhirunthu Paarkum Marmam Enna was inspired from a popular song which was part of the 1968 Tamil film Thillana Mohanambal.

The film also begins with the motto says 'true independence is when a woman can walk on the street with wearing jewelleries at midnight without the fear of being attacked and without being afraid about chain theft'.

The filming of the movie was shot in areas including Ennore and Vysarpadi with the production being completed in around 2017. However the release of the film was delayed on numerous occasions due to the censorship issues.

The trailer of the film was launched and released on 23 June 2018 by film directors Venkat Prabhu and Jayam Raja.

Soundtrack 
The music for the film is scored by Achu Rajamani and lyrics are penned by popular lyricist Pa. Vijay and lyricist Pa.Meenachisundaram. The film consists of four songs.

References 

Indian thriller films
2018 thriller films
Indian drama films
Indian crime drama films
Films about organised crime in India
Films scored by Achu Rajamani